The 2019 Pro Bowl was the National Football League's all-star game for the 2018 NFL season, played on January 27, 2019, at Camping World Stadium in Orlando, Florida. It was televised nationally by ESPN and its sister networks.

Game format
The 2019 game featured the same format as the previous five editions. For the sixth straight year, the Pro Bowl differed from standard NFL game rules and format in that there were no kickoffs and every quarter had a two-minute warning. Also, the play clock was only 35 seconds, and the game clock ran after pass incompletions, except with less than two minutes left in either half (or overtime, had it been necessary).

As with the previous Pro Bowl, a modified limited-contact form was used, and play was called dead as soon as a player was surrounded and likely to be tackled.

Summary

Box score

Scoring summary

Source:

Game statistics

AFC Rosters
The following players were selected to represent the AFC:

Offense

Defense

Special teams

Notes:
Players must have accepted their invitations as alternates to be listed; those who declined are not considered Pro Bowlers.

bold player who participated in game
 signifies the player has been selected as a captain
Replacement player selection due to injury or vacancy
Injured/suspended player; selected but did not participate
Replacement starter; selected as reserve
Selected but did not play because his team advanced to Super Bowl LIII (see Pro Bowl "Player Selection" section)
Selected but chose not to participate

NFC rosters
The following players were selected to represent the NFC:

Offense

Defense

Special teams

Notes:
Players must have accepted their invitations as alternates to be listed; those who declined are not considered Pro Bowlers.

bold player who participated in game
 signifies the player has been selected as a captain
Replacement Player selection due to injury or vacancy
Injured/suspended player; selected but did not participate
Replacement starter; selected as reserve
Selected but did not play because his team advanced to Super Bowl LIII (see Pro Bowl "Player Selection" section)

Number of selections per team

Background

Host selection process
This was the last year of a three-year deal that began in 2017 that the Pro Bowl will be held at Camping World Stadium in Orlando, Florida.

Broadcasting
The game was televised nationally by ESPN, and simulcasted by ABC and Disney XD, and broadcast via radio by Westwood One. The game was carried in Spanish by ESPN Deportes. In contrast to the network's "megacast" approach to other multi-network games, all three English-language TV channels carried the same feed. It was the first time the NFL Pro Bowl was aired on a cable network that targets children: Disney XD.

References

External links
Official website
Box score at ESPN

2019
2018 National Football League season
2019 in American football
American football in Orlando, Florida
Pro Bowl
Sports competitions in Orlando, Florida
2019 in sports in Florida
Simulcasts
2010s in Orlando, Florida